Strehlow is a German surname. Notable people with this surname include:

August W. Strehlow (1867–1943), German-American politician in Wisconsin
Bertha Strehlow (1911–1984), Australian educator, wife of Ted
Carl Strehlow (1871–1922), German missionary in Central Australia
Frieda Strehlow (1875–1967), German missionary, wife of Carl
John Strehlow (born 1946), Australian stage director and writer, son of Ted and Bertha
Theodor George Henry (Ted) Strehlow (1908–1978), Australian anthropologist, son of Carl and Frieda 
Wendy Strehlow (born c. 1958), Australian actress

See also
Strehlow Research Centre, Alice Springs, Australia, named after Ted
Strehlow Terrace, North Omaha, Nebraska
Strelow (disambiguation)